The following list includes the nominees and winners for Billboard Music Award for Top Rock Artist.

Winners and nominees

Superlatives

The following individuals received two or more Top Rock Artist Awards:

The following individuals received two or more Top Rock Artist nominations:

References

Top Rock Artist
Rock music awards